Madison Copiak (born ) is a Canadian artistic gymnast. She was part of the Canadian team at the 2015 World Artistic Gymnastics Championships, serving as the alternate.

References

1998 births
Living people
Canadian female artistic gymnasts
Gymnasts at the 2015 Pan American Games
Pan American Games silver medalists for Canada
Pan American Games medalists in gymnastics
Medalists at the 2015 Pan American Games
20th-century Canadian women
21st-century Canadian women